Ali Manzoor (born 8 January 1991) is a Pakistani cricketer. He made his first-class debut for Lahore cricket team in the 2011–12 Quaid-e-Azam Trophy on 6 October 2011.

References

External links
 

1991 births
Living people
Pakistani cricketers
Lahore cricketers
National Bank of Pakistan cricketers
Kalutara Town Club cricketers
Cricketers from Lahore